Chalgarud (also Romanized as Chālgarūd; also known as Chālgar) is a village in Sanjabad-e Gharbi Rural District, in the Central District of Kowsar County, Ardabil Province, Iran. At the 2006 census, its population was 531, in 110 families.

References 

Tageo

Towns and villages in Kowsar County